Reinar Hallik (born 5 January 1984) is an Estonian retired professional basketball player. Standing at 2.08 m (6 ft 10 in), he played at the power forward position.

Hallik represented the Estonian national basketball team internationally since 2012.

Professional career
Hallik began his professional career in 2001 with Hotronic of the Korvpalli Meistriliiga. In the next season, he played for Audentes.

In 2003, Hallik signed for Estonian champions Tallinna Kalev.

In 2004, Hallik joined Myleasecar Giants of the Dutch Basketball League. In January 2005, he returned to Estonia and rejoined Audentes.

In 2005, Hallik joined Dalkia/Nybit. In January 2006, he was loaned to Rakvere. In the 2005–06 season, Hallik averaged 7.1 points and 5.1 rebounds per game.

In July 2006, Hallik signed for Sallén Basket of the Swedish Basketligan, but spent most of the preseason with Rakvere Tarvas, helping the club in Estonian Cup games, before joining the Swedish club in October.

In June 2007, Hallik joined Finnish Korisliiga champions LrNMKY. On 9 December 2007, he won the Finnish Cup. On 29 January 2008, he left LrNMKY and returned to Estonia. On 6 February 2008, he signed for Valga Welg.

In 2009, Hallik signed for Rakvere Tarvas. In the 2009–10 season, Hallik averaged 11.7 points and 4.9 rebounds per game. Rakvere Tarvas finished the regular season in second place and reached the finals in the playoffs, but lost the series to University of Tartu 2–4.

On 28 June 2010, Hallik joined French Nationale 2 club USAP Basket.

Hallik returned to Rakvere Tarvas for the 2011–12 season. Rakvere Tarvas finished the season in third place, while Hallik averaged 14.4 points and 6 rebounds per game.

On 15 August 2012, Hallik signed for U-Mobitelco Cluj of the Romanian Liga Națională. On 1 January 2013, he left the club and joined Universitatea Craiova.

On 6 February 2014, Hallik signed with Oradea. Oradea finished the 2013–14 season as runners-up, losing to Asesoft Ploiești 2–3 in the finals.

On 20 August 2014, Hallik signed with Estonian champions Kalev/Cramo. On 20 January 2015, he was loaned to Rakvere Tarvas for the remainder of the 2014–15 season.

On 20 September 2015, Hallik signed with Falco Szombathely of the Hungarian Nemzeti Bajnokság I/A. In February 2016, he left the club and returned to Estonia, where he signed for Estonian champions University of Tartu for the remainder of the 2015–16 season. University of Tartu failed to defend the title, losing to Kalev/Cramo in the finals.

On 4 July 2016, Hallik joined Pärnu. He retired from professional basketball after the 2016–17 season.

Estonian national team
As a member of the senior Estonian national basketball team, Hallik competed at the EuroBasket 2015, averaging 1 point and 1 rebound in 3 minutes per game. Estonia finished the tournament in 20th place.
Despite the limited playing time, Hallik has been a fan favorite because of his likable character and streaky three-point shooting. During his tenure with the national team,  Estonian supporters chanted on many occasions for Hallik to be substituted in when he was on the bench.

Awards and accomplishments

Professional career
LrNMKY
 Finnish Cup champion: 2007

References

External links
 Reinar Hallik at basket.ee 
 Reinar Hallik at fiba.com

1984 births
Living people
Sportspeople from Narva
Estonian men's basketball players
Power forwards (basketball)
Centers (basketball)
Korvpalli Meistriliiga players
Dutch Basketball League players
West-Brabant Giants players
BC Rakvere Tarvas players
BC Valga players
BC Kalev/Cramo players
University of Tartu basketball team players
KK Pärnu players
Estonian expatriate basketball people in the Netherlands
Estonian expatriate basketball people in Sweden
Estonian expatriate basketball people in Finland
Estonian expatriate basketball people in France
Estonian expatriate basketball people in Romania
Estonian expatriate basketball people in Hungary